Edward Samuel Farrow, (April 20, 1855 – September 8, 1926) born in Worcester County, Maryland, was an author and a commander in the American Indian Wars of the late 19th century. He is particularly known for his service in the Sheepeater Indian War. Farrow was a graduate of the West Point Military Academy in 1876, and was a commanding officer of Indian Scouts in the Departments of the Columbia. He went on to become Assistant Instructor of Tactics at the US Military Academy (West Point), and published prolifically on the subject of Native American Indians, Military Training, and Mountain Scouting.

Works
 
 A Military System of Gymnastics Exercises and a System of Swimming
 Farrows Manual on Military Training (1920)
 American Small Arms - A veritable Encyclopedia of Knowledge for Sportsmen and Military Men
 
 Mineral Resources of Bland County in Southwestern Virginia
 
 Gas Warfare

References

1855 births
1926 deaths
People from Worcester County, Maryland
 
United States Army officers
United States Military Academy alumni
United States Military Academy faculty